Oidiphorus is a small genus of marine ray-finned fishes belonging to the family Zoarcidae, the eelpouts. It’s two species are found in the southwestern Atlantic Ocean and the Southern Ocean.

Species
Oidiphorus contains 2 species:

References

Lycodinae
Ray-finned fish genera